The Georgia Tech Yellow Jackets men's basketball team represents the Georgia Tech Yellow Jackets in NCAA Division I basketball. The team plays its home games in McCamish Pavilion on the school's Atlanta campus and is currently coached by Damon Stoudamire. Bobby Cremins led his team to the first ACC tournament victory in school history in 1985 and in 1990 he took Georgia Tech to the school's first Final Four appearance ever. Cremins retired from Georgia Tech in 2000 with the school's best winning percentage as a head coach. The Yellow Jackets returned to the Final Four in 2004 under Paul Hewitt and lost in the national title game, losing to UConn. Overall, the team has won 1,352 games and lost 1,226 games, a .524 win percentage.

History

Georgia Tech's first recorded official participation in basketball was in 1906, when a small club organized under Coach Chapman. They won two of the three games they played that season. The next time Tech had a basketball team, it was under the famous coach John Heisman, also Tech's baseball and football coach. Heisman had a winning percentage of .142 that season and improved the team's percentage to .500 in 1912 and 1913.

Since that time, Georgia Tech has forged a solid basketball program on the strength of coaches like John Hyder and Bobby Cremins, and such players as Roger Kaiser, Rich Yunkus, Mark Price, Craig "Noodles" Neal, John Salley, Tom Hammonds, and Matt Harpring. Georgia Tech became a charter member of the Southeastern Conference in 1932 (the first season was in 1933) and won the conference title in 1938. Coach Hyder, whose teams won 292 games in 22 seasons, put the program on the national map when his 1955 team defeated Adolph Rupp's Kentucky team, ending the Wildcats' 129-game winning streak at home.

John Hyder

The Yellow Jackets played their first NCAA tournament game in 1960. Coached by Hyder and led by all-American Kaiser, the team defeated Ohio University before losing in the second round to the eventual champion, Ohio State. Hyder continued to have strong teams in the 1960s and 1970s. In 1964, Georgia Tech's final season in the Southeastern Conference, the team went undefeated at home and was the conference runner-up. In 1971 the Yellow Jackets, led by Yunkus, reached the finals of the National Invitation Tournament but lost to the University of North Carolina.

Georgia Tech became a charter member of the Metro Conference in 1975 (the first season started in 1976), and then became the eighth member of the ACC in 1978 (starting play in 1979). As of the 2020–2021 season, the Yellow Jackets have won four ACC tournament championships and been the ACC's top seed twice. Through 2021, Georgia Tech has received 17 berths in the NCAA tournament, and seven of its teams have made it to the Sweet Sixteen.

Bobby Cremins

The 1985 team, led by head coach Bobby Cremins and players Mark Price, Duane Ferrell, Yvon Joseph, Craig Neal, Bruce Dalrymple, and John Salley, won the school's first ACC championship and advanced to the final eight in the NCAA tournament. In the 1990 tournament, the trio of Kenny Anderson, Dennis Scott, & Brian Oliver (nicknamed "Lethal Weapon 3") carried the Yellow Jackets all the way to the Final Four, where they lost to eventual champion UNLV in the national semi-finals. In 1992, Cremins led an inexperienced Tech team to the Sweet 16, thanks in no small part to James Forrest's buzzer-beating game-winning 3-pointer in the second round against USC. The following year, the Yellow Jackets won the ACC tournament.

Georgia Tech's nine consecutive appearances in the NCAA Tournament from the mid-1980s and the early 1990s accounted for the nation's fourth-longest active streak before it ended in 1994. In 1996, the team finished first in the ACC's regular season and returned to the tournament behind future NBA All-Star Stephon Marbury. Cremins's 19-year tenure (1981–2000) stands as the team's most successful era. Cremins is Georgia Tech's all-time winningest coach and is third among all ACC coaches. Upon his retirement after the 1999–2000 season, his teams had won 354 games and lost 237 for a .599 winning percentage (Cremins would later come out of retirement to coach at the College of Charleston). The floor at McCamish Pavilion is named "Cremins Court" in his honor.

Paul Hewitt
In 2000, head coach Paul Hewitt was hired away from Siena College and immediately helped to revitalize the Yellow Jacket program.  In his first season, Georgia Tech beat UCLA, Kentucky and five ACC rivals that were ranked en route to an NCAA tournament appearance.  Georgia Tech experienced a Cinderella season in 2003–2004: winning the Preseason NIT, ending Duke's 41-game winning streak at Cameron Indoor Stadium, making it to the school's second Final Four and first national championship game, in which they lost by nine points to UConn. Notable players sent to the NBA under Hewitt include Chris Bosh, Jarrett Jack, Mario West, Luke Schenscher, Thaddeus Young, Will Bynum and Anthony Morrow. In back-to-back years (2008 & 2009), Hewitt also successfully recruited national top-10 high school prospects in Iman Shumpert and Derrick Favors.

During the 2009–2010 season, the Yellow Jackets played for the ACC tournament championship game as well as earning Hewitt's fifth NCAA tournament appearance at Tech.  They advanced to the round of 32, losing to The Ohio State University.  Georgia Tech then finished the 2010–11 season 13–18.  On March 12, 2011, Paul Hewitt was dismissed as the head coach of the Georgia Tech after 11 seasons.  Brian Gregory was appointed as his successor, Georgia Tech's 13th men's basketball coach, on March 28, 2011.

Brian Gregory
Brian Gregory, who led Dayton to 97 victories over his last four seasons there and worked under Tom Izzo at Michigan State when the Spartans won the 2000 NCAA Championship, was named Georgia Tech's head men's basketball coach on March 28, 2011. In their first season with Gregory at the helm, Georgia Tech finished 11–20 and 11th in the ACC while playing without a true home court while McCamish Pavilion was under construction. Gregory only had two seasons with overall winning records and no seasons of winning records in ACC play. On March 25, 2016, after five disappointing seasons and no trips to the NCAA Tournament, Georgia Tech fired Brian Gregory. He was 76–86 overall and 27–61 in ACC play.

Josh Pastner
Josh Pastner was hired by the school on April 8, 2016. Pastner was 167–73 with four NCAA tournament bids in seven years as the head coach of Memphis.

Pastner took Tech to the NIT finals in his first season, and was that season's ACC Coach of The Year. After that season Tech was hit with NCAA violations, although most punishments would later be dropped. Because of this, Tech struggled for the next few seasons. However, Pastner ultimately led the team to their first ACC title since 1993, as well as their first NCAA tournament berth since 2010, as the Yellow Jackets defeated Florida State to win the 2021 ACC Championship. They would end up losing to Loyola Chicago in the first round of the NCAA Tournament. It is Tech's latest postseason appearance.   

The success wouldn’t last though, Tech parted ways with Pastner on March 10, 2023 following two disappointing seasons. He finished 109-113 in his seven years coaching the Jackets. He finished as the fourth winningest coach in school history, behind only Hewitt, Hyder, and Cremins.

Damon Stoudamire
On March 13, 2023 Damon Stoudamire was named the fifteenth coach in program history. Stoudamire came to Georgia Tech after serving as an assistant coach of the Boston Celtics for nearly two seasons. Before that he served as the head coach at Pacific from 2016–2021.

Postseason

NCAA tournament results
The Yellow Jackets have appeared in the NCAA tournament 17 times. Their combined record is 23–17.

NIT results
The Yellow Jackets have appeared in the National Invitation Tournament (NIT) nine times. Their combined record is 13–9.

Coaches

Players

Many famous and talented players have played with the Yellow Jackets. Dennis Scott was the 1990 National Player of the Year and the 1990 ACC Player of the Year, Jarrett Jack was the 2005 Basketball Times All-South player.

A notable fictitious player for the Yellow Jackets is eternal Tech student George P. Burdell, who is officially listed in team media guides as having earned three letters (1956–58).

Retired numbers

All-Americans

All-time leaders

Points

Rebounds

Assists

Steals

Blocks

Arena

The Hank McCamish Pavilion, rebuilt and renamed from Alexander Memorial Coliseum (also nicknamed "The Thrillerdome") in 2012, is an indoor arena located on Tech's Midtown Atlanta campus. It is the home of the Georgia Tech basketball teams and hosted the Atlanta Hawks of the National Basketball Association from 1968–1972 and again from 1997–1999. Tech's women's volleyball team occasionally uses the facility as well, primarily for NCAA tournament games and other matches that draw crowds that would overflow the O'Keefe Gymnasium. During the 2011–12 season, the Yellow Jackets split their home schedule between Philips Arena and the Arena at Gwinnett Center in suburban Duluth while McCamish Pavilion was under reconstruction.

References

External links